A loan shark is an individual who loans money at high interest.

Loan shark and Loanshark may also refer to:

 Loan Shark (film), a 1952 American crime film noir
 Loanshark (film), a 1999 American crime film
 "Loanshark Blues", a song from the Rory Gallagher album Defender

See also
The Lone Shark, an American public-access cable TV program